Earncraig Hill is a hill in the Lowther Hills range, part of the Southern Uplands of Scotland. The lowest and craggiest Donald hill in the range, it lies on the border between Dumfries and Galloway and South Lanarkshire, helping form the source of the River Clyde. It is most quickly ascended from the Daer Reservoir to the north or from Mitchellslacks to the south, passing by Burleywhag bothy.

References

Mountains and hills of the Southern Uplands
Mountains and hills of Dumfries and Galloway
Mountains and hills of South Lanarkshire
Donald mountains